The 1973 Australian Touring Car Championship was the 14th running of the Australian Touring Car Championship. It began at Symmons Plains on 5 March 1973 and ended at Warwick Farm after eight rounds. The series was won by Allan Moffat in a Ford Falcon GTHO Phase III.

The night before Round 6 of the series at the Adelaide International Raceway, Moffat's GTHO Falcon was stolen from Stillwell Ford in the northern Adelaide suburb of Medindie. Rather than see Moffat out of the race (he was the series points leader at the time having won the opening 4 rounds and finishing 3rd in round 5), Murray Carter loaned Moffat his GTHO Falcon for the race. Peter Brock won the race while Moffat kept his points lead by finishing second. Moffat's stolen Falcon was later found abandoned in the Adelaide Hills where the thieves who had taken it for a "joy ride" dumped it when it ran out of fuel.

Teams and drivers
The following drivers competed in the 1973 ATCC. The series consisted of eight rounds held in six different states. As of 2022, Elemer Vajda's entry is still the only Subaru to have contested an ATCC/V8 Supercars race.

Calendar
The 1973 Australian Touring Car Championship consisted of eight rounds.

Drivers Championship
Points were awarded 4-3-2-1 for the first four race positions, and then 9-6-4-3-2-1 for the top 6 of each class.

References

Australian Touring Car Championship seasons
Touring Cars